Driller killer may refer to:

Film
 The Driller Killer, 1979 horror film
 the "driller killer" is the nickname for Russ Thorn, the villain in The Slumber Party Massacre series
 the killer from 1984 film Body Double, sometimes referred to as the "driller killer"

Music
 Driller Killer (band), a Swedish metal band
 "Driller Killer" (song), a 1981 song by Mortician, off the album House by the Cemetery (EP)
 "Driller Killer" (song), a 1992 song by Nekromantix, off the album Brought Back to Life
 "The Driller Killer" (song), a 2006 song by Angerfist, off the album Pissin' Razorbladez

See also

 Özkan Zengin (born 1982) Turkish serial killer nicknamed the "Well Driller Killer"
 
 Driller (disambiguation)
 Killer (disambiguation)